Koro Zuba is a Nupoid language of Nigeria. It is one of several languages which go by the ethnic name Koro. However, it has very low (~ 7%) lexical similarity with Koro Nulu (a.k.a. Koro Ija), which speakers consider to be a variant of the same language (along with Jijili language) due to ethnic identity, and instead is closest to Dibo.

References

Languages of Nigeria
South Plateau languages